Aristida adscensionis is a species of grass known by the common name sixweeks threeawn. It is native to the Americas but it is distributed nearly worldwide. It grows easily in disturbed and waste areas and has potential to become a weed.

Description
This annual bunchgrass is quite variable in appearance, its size and shape determined largely by environmental conditions. It grows in a tuft to heights between 5 and 80 centimeters. It forms a narrow inflorescence of spikelets, each fruit with three awns.

References

External links
 Jepson Manual Treatment
 USDA Plants Profile
 Grass Manual Treatment
 Kew GrassBase

adscensionis
Bunchgrasses of North America
Native grasses of California
Flora of the California desert regions
North American desert flora
Grasses of the United States
Flora of the Southwestern United States
Plants described in 1753
Taxa named by Carl Linnaeus
Flora without expected TNC conservation status